is a Japanese anime director, best known for working on shōjo-based anime and in the magical girl genre. He was formerly associated with TYO Animations (formerly Hal Film Maker).

Born in Ama, Aichi Prefecture, Japan, his first major work was directing the first two seasons of Sailor Moon for Toei Animation, after which he handed the position over to Kunihiko Ikuhara, although he continued to storyboard and direct episodes for the later seasons. He later went on to co-direct Ojamajo Doremi and Princess Tutu. Sato served as chief director for long-runner Sgt. Frog, and in recent years has become more known for his "healing anime" such as Aria and Tamayura.

Works

Anime television
Queen Millennia (1981) (Production Manager)
Patalliro! (1982) (Production Manager)
Bemubemu Hunter Kotengu Tenmaru (1983) (Storyboard, Episode Director)
Tongari Bōshi no Memoru ("Wee Wendy" in the U.S.) (1984) (Storyboard, Episode Director)
Mobile Suit Zeta Gundam (1985) (Storyboard)
Hai Step Jun (1985) (Assistant Series Director, Storyboard, Episode Director)
Maple Town Monogatari (1986) (Series Director)
Akuma-kun (1989) (Series Director)
Kimama ni Idol (1990) (Director)
Mooretsu Atarō (1990) (Series Director)
Goldfish Warning! (1991) (Series Director)
Sailor Moon (1992) (Series Director)
Sailor Moon R (1993) (Chief Director, #1–13)
Neon Genesis Evangelion (1995) (Storyboard) (as "Kiichi Hadame")
Yume no Crayon Oukoku (1997–1999) (Series Director)
Ojamajo Doremi (1999) (Chief Director)
Magic User's Club (1999) (Original Plan, Director)
Strange Dawn (2000) (Chief Director)
Gate Keepers (2000) (Chief Director)
Prétear (2001) (Original Creator, Chief Director)
Princess Tutu (2002) (Chief Director)
Kaleido Star (2003) (Original Plan, Director)
Sgt. Frog (2004) (Chief Director)
Fushigiboshi no Futagohime (2005) (Chief Director)
Aria the Animation (2005) (Director, Series Composition)
Fushigiboshi no Futagohime Gyu! (2006) (Chief Director)
Aria the Natural (2006) (Director, Series Composition)
Romeo × Juliet (2007) (Sound Supervisor)
Sketchbook ~full color'S~ (2007) (Supervisor)
Aria the Origination (2008) (Director, Series Composition)
Umi Monogatari ~Anata ga Ite Kureta Koto~ (Sea Story: That You Were There For Me) (2009) (Director) 
Croisée in a Foreign Labyrinth (2011) (Series Composition)
Tamayura: Hitotose (2011) (Director)
Phi Brain: Puzzle of God (2011) (Director)
One Off (2012) (Director)
Tamayura: More Aggressive (2013) (Director)
M3 the dark metal (2014) (Director)
Amanchu! (2016) (Chief Director)
Amanchu! Advance (2018) (Chief Director)
Hugtto! PreCure (2018-2019) (Series Director)
Waccha PriMagi! (2021-Present) (Chief Director)
Akuma-kun (TBA) (Chief Director)

Anime movie
Sleeping Beauty (1983) (Director)
Tongari Bōshi no Memoru (1985) (Director)
Akuma-kun (1989) (Director)
Goldfish Warning! (1992) (Director)
Junkers Come Here (1995) (Director)
The End of Evangelion (1997) (Storyboard)
Slayers Premium (2001) (Screenplay, Director)
Keroro Gunso the Super Movie (2006) (Chief Director)
Keroro Gunso the Super Movie 2: The Deep Sea Princess (2007) (Chief Director)
Evangelion: 2.0 (2008) (Storyboard)
Keroro Gunso the Super Movie 3: Keroro vs. Keroro Great Sky Duel (2008) (Chief Director)
A Whisker Away (2020) (Director)
Looking for Magical Doremi (2020) (Director)
Aria the Crepusculo (2021) (Chief Director)
Aria the Benedizione (2021) (Chief Director)

OVA
Magic User's Club (1996) (Original Plan, Director)
Kaleido Star: New Wings -Extra Stage- (2004) (Director) (with Yoshimasa Hiraike)
Ojamajo Doremi Na-i-sho (2004) (Director)
Kaleido Star: Legend of phoenix 〜Layla Hamilton Monogatari〜 (2005) (Original Plan, Director, Sound Director)
ARIA The OVA 〜ARIETTA〜 (2007) (Director, Screenplay, Storyboard)
Tamayura (2010) (Director)
Zetsumetsu Kigu Shōjo Amazing Twins (2014) (Director)
 Tamayura: Sotsugyō Shashin (2015) (Director, Series Composition)

References

External links
 
 
 Junichi Sato on Twitter

1960 births
Living people
People from Ama, Aichi
Anime directors